Sand lily is a common name for several flowering plants and may refer to:

Leucocrinum montanum, in the asparagus family, Asparagaceae, native to the western United States
Pancratium maritimum, in the amaryllis family, Amaryllidaceae, native to Europe and western Asia